Melvin Ray Sanders (born January 3, 1981) is an American former professional basketball player. He played for the National Basketball Association's San Antonio Spurs.

Professional career
A graduate of Oklahoma State University, Sanders, a guard and forward, played for Varese in the Italian league and Telindus Oostende in Belgium, the Dakota Wizards of the Continental Basketball Association (CBA), and the NBA Development League's Fayetteville Patriots. He earned All-CBA Second Team and All-Defensive Team honors with the Wizards in 2005. During the 2005-06 NBA season, he signed 10-day contract stints with the San Antonio Spurs.  After his fourth such contract (including training camp) expired, on March 26, 2006, the Spurs signed Sanders for the remainder of the season.

On January 9, 2007, he signed a contract with Pau-Orthez of the French League. He averaged 10.5 points, 3.3 rebounds and 1.2 steals in 10 Euroleague games, and also helped Pau win the French Cup. On July 20, 2007, Sanders signed with Panellinios of the Greek League. However, in mid-December 2007 he was brought out of his contract by one of the top clubs in the ACB Unicaja Malaga after seeing limited action due to a broken collarbone sustained in a car accident during the preseason.

On December 25, 2007, he signed with Unicaja of the Spanish ACB. On July 10, 2008, Sanders was signed by Kalise Gran Canaria of the ACB.

He signed with BC Minsk-2006 in September 2010. In February 2011, he signed with Menorca Bàsquet. Later that year, he signed with Hacettepe Üniversitesi of the Turkish Basketball League.

In August 2012, he signed with Basket Barcellona of the Italian Second League. On March 6, 2013, he signed a contract with Pınar Karşıyaka for the remainder of that season.

In December 2013, Sanders signed with CB Valladolid and left the team on 21 January 2014 because of non-payment from the club.

References

External links
NBA.com Official profile
EurocupBasketball.com profile

1981 births
Living people
African-American basketball players
American expatriate basketball people in Belarus
American expatriate basketball people in Belgium
American expatriate basketball people in France
American expatriate basketball people in Greece
American expatriate basketball people in Italy
American expatriate basketball people in Spain
American expatriate basketball people in Turkey
Basketball players from Kansas
American men's basketball players
BC Oostende players
Baloncesto Málaga players
BC Tsmoki-Minsk players
CB Gran Canaria players
CB Valladolid players
Dakota Wizards (CBA) players
Élan Béarnais players
Fayetteville Patriots players
Greek Basket League players
Hacettepe Üniversitesi B.K. players
Junior college men's basketball players in the United States
Karşıyaka basketball players
Liga ACB players
Menorca Bàsquet players
Oklahoma State Cowboys basketball players
Pallacanestro Varese players
Panellinios B.C. players
People from Liberal, Kansas
San Antonio Spurs players
Shooting guards
Small forwards
Undrafted National Basketball Association players
21st-century African-American sportspeople
20th-century African-American people